Gerald Cuffe (24 July 1669 – after 1715) was an Irish  politician.

Cuffe was born in Dublin and educated at Trinity College, Dublin.

He sat in the House of Commons of Ireland from 1703 to 1714, as a Member of Parliament for Castlebar.

He was the son of Sir James Cuffe (died 1678) and Alice Aungier.

References 
 

1669 births
Year of death unknown
Irish MPs 1703–1713
Irish MPs 1713–1714
Members of the Parliament of Ireland (pre-1801) for County Mayo constituencies
Alumni of Trinity College Dublin